Daniel or Dan Cooper may refer to:
 Sir Daniel Cooper, 1st Baronet (1821–1902), speaker of the Legislative Assembly of New South Wales
 Dan Cooper, alias used by the aircraft hijacker whom the media later dubbed D. B. Cooper
 Dan Cooper (born 1946), executive producer, author, and Fox News journalist
 Daniel C. Cooper (1773–1818), American surveyor, farmer, miller and political leader
 Daniel Cooper (convict and merchant) (1785–1853), convict transported to New South Wales who became a successful merchant
 Dan Cooper (comics), a fictional character featured in Tintin magazine between 1954 and 1977
 Dan Cooper (CSI: Miami), a fictional character who works in the lab in CSI: Miami, played by Brendan Fehr
 Daniel Cooper (murderer) (1881–1923), convicted New Zealand baby farmer and illegal abortionist
 Daniel Cooper (motorcyclist) (born 1987), British motorcycle racer